The 1889 North Dakota gubernatorial election was held on October 1, 1889. Republican nominee John Miller defeated Democratic nominee William N. Roach with 66.58% of the vote.

General election

Candidates
John Miller, Republican
William N. Roach, Democratic

Results

References

1889
North Dakota
Gubernatorial